Bonaduz is a municipality in the Imboden Region in the Swiss canton of Graubünden.

History
Bonaduz is first mentioned in 960 as Beneduces.  Until 1854, the German-speaking hamlet of Sculms belonged to Bonaduz.  Following a vote in that year, Sculms joined Versam.

Geography

Of this area, 25.2% is used for agricultural purposes, while 61.3% is forested. Of the rest of the land, 7.3% is settled (buildings or roads) and the remainder (6.2%) is non-productive (rivers, glaciers or mountains).

Until 2017 the municipality was located in the Rhäzüns sub-district, of the Imboden district, after 2017 it became part of the Imboden Region.  It consists of the haufendorf (an irregular, unplanned and quite closely packed village, built around a central square) of Bonaduz on a high plain south-west of the confluence of the Hinterrhein and Vorderrhein.

Demographics
, 10.8% of the population was made up of foreign nationals. Over the last 10 years the population has grown at a rate of 11.7%.

, the gender distribution of the population was 49.5% male and 50.5% female.  The age distribution, in Bonaduz is; 373 people or 15.3% of the population are between 0 and 9 years old.  162 people or 6.7% are 10 to 14, and 158 people or 6.5% are 15 to 19.  Of the adult population, 219 people or 9.0% of the population are between 20 and 29 years old.  489 people or 20.1% are 30 to 39, 394 people or 16.2% are 40 to 49, and 292 people or 12.0% are 50 to 59.  The senior population distribution is 150 people or 6.2% of the population are between 60 and 69 years old, 133 people or 5.5% are 70 to 79, there are 54 people or 2.2% who are 80 to 89, and there are 9 people or 0.4% who are 90 to 99.

In the 2007 federal election the most popular party was the CVP which received 32% of the vote.  The next three most popular parties were the SVP (31.9%), the SPS (22.4%) and the FDP (12.3%).

In Bonaduz about 77.3% of the population (between age 25-64) have completed either non-mandatory upper secondary education or additional higher education (either university or a Fachhochschule).

Bonaduz has an unemployment rate of 1.41%.  , there were 32 people employed in the primary economic sector and about 11 businesses involved in this sector.  555 people are employed in the secondary sector and there are 26 businesses in this sector.  361 people are employed in the tertiary sector, with 74 businesses in this sector.

Of the rest of the population,  there are 10 individuals (or about 0.41% of the population) who belong to the Orthodox Church, and there are 47 individuals (or about 1.93% of the population) who belong to another Christian church. There are 45 (or about 1.85% of the population) who are Islamic. There are 14 individuals (or about 0.58% of the population) who belong to another church (not listed on the census), 120 (or about 4.93% of the population) belong to no church, are agnostic or atheist, and 86 individuals (or about 3.53% of the population) did not answer the question.

The historical population is given in the following table:

Languages
Most of the population speaks German (88.0%), with Romansh being second most common (5.4%) and Italian being third (2.1%).

Transportation

Rhaetian Railway operate services to Bonaduz (Rhaetian Railway station).

References

External links
 

 
Municipalities of Graubünden
Populated places on the Rhine